The Westchester Stakes is a Grade III American Thoroughbred horse race for three-years-old and older run over a distance of  miles annually in early May at Belmont Park, in Elmont, New York. The event currently offers a purse of $100,000 added.

History
Originally called the Yorktown Handicap, it was first run in 1918 at the old Empire City Race Track and was won by the 1916 Kentucky Derby winner George Smith.

For 1919, it was called the Victory Handicap, but in 1922 reverted to the Yorktown Handicap. 
There was no race run in 1932 and 1933 during the Great Depression.

In 1940 it was renamed the name Westchester Handicap in honor of Westchester County, New York. The race was hosted by the Jamaica Racetrack from 1943 to 1959 yet idle between 1954 and 1958. After which it was shifted to Aqueduct Racetrack.

From 1959 to 1971, the race was open to horses age four years old and up.

Since 2012 the event has been run at Belmont Park.

Records
Speed record:
 1:32.24 – 1 mile: Najran (2003)

Most wins:
 2 – Thorson (1936, 1937)
 2 – R. Thomas (1966, 1968)
 2 – Rubiano (1991, 1992)
 2 – Gygistar (2004, 2005)

Most wins by a jockey:
 5 – Ángel Cordero Jr. (1969, 1972, 1976, 1984, 1990)

Most wins by a trainer:
 6 – H. Allen Jerkens (1975, 1982, 1983, 1994, 1998, 2010)

Most wins by an owner:
 3 – Alfred G. Vanderbilt II (1935, 1973, 1974)
 3 – King Ranch (1946, 1947, 1948)
 3 – Edward P. Evans (2001, 2004, 2005)

Winners

References

External links
 Video of Najran's record setting 2003 Westchester Handicap

Graded stakes races in the United States
Horse races in New York (state)
Open mile category horse races
Recurring sporting events established in 1918
Belmont Park
Grade 3 stakes races in the United States
1918 establishments in New York (state)